The Qinhuangdao–Binzhou Expressway, designated as G0111 and commonly abbreviated as Qinbin Expressway is an expressway in northeastern China linking the cities of Qinhuangdao and Binzhou through Tianjin.  This expressway is a branch of G1 Jingha Expressway.

Detailed itinerary

References

Expressways in Hebei
Expressways in Tianjin
Expressways in Shandong
0111